Bibiane Schoofs (born 13 May 1988), previously known as Bibiane Weijers, is a Dutch professional tennis player.

On 11 June 2012, she reached her career-high WTA singles ranking of 142, whilst her best doubles ranking was world No. 83 on 2 April 2018. She married on 7 July 2014, and took her husband's surname, however, in late 2016, reverted to her maiden name, Schoofs.
In December 2016, she became national singles champion under that name.

In her career, she has won eight singles tournaments on the ITF Women's Circuit, three of them in 2011. In doubles, she has won 21 ITF titles, three of them in 2017. At age 29, she won the doubles title at the 2017 Mumbai Open, a tournament on the Challenger-level. In January 2018, she won her first doubles title on WTA Tour, at the tournament of Auckland and second in Lyon in 2023.

Playing for Netherlands Fed Cup team, Schoofs has a win–loss record of 3–9.

Career highlights

2011
Her best season so far has been in 2011 when she climbed more than 250 places in the rankings and won two $25k tournaments, in Montpellier and Middelburg. She also reached the finals in Prague and Zwevegem.

At the end of the season, Schoofs qualified for the Luxembourg Open, thus making her debut in a WTA Tour event. She played Angelique Kerber in the first round and recorded the biggest win of her career, defeating the world No. 29 in three sets after being down 6–2, 2–0. She then caused another upset against world No. 62, Canadian Rebecca Marino, defeating her in the second round in three sets. Her run was ended by British qualifier Anne Keothavong in the quarterfinals where she was beaten 6–3, 6–2.

2012
Schoofs began her year as a qualifier at the Auckland Open, but lost to Monica Puig, leading 6–2, 5–4 and 6–2, 6–7, 3–0.

She then qualified for the Australian Open. In a 2.5 hour match, she outlasted Kazakh Yaroslava Shvedova 11–9 in the final set. In the second round she lost to Russian teenager Irina Khromacheva.

In Fed Cup competitions, Schoofs played four matches, winning two. She then was out for two months after a thigh injury.

She started playing again at a $25k event in Civitavecchia, Italy. She won against Anna Floris, but lost to eventual winner María Teresa Torró Flor in two sets. In the following week, she reached the semifinals at $25k event in Tunis defeating Çağla Büyükakçay, Pemra Özgen and Ana Savić, all in straight sets. She was beaten in three sets by Sandra Zaniewska. She played at the $50k Saint-Gaudens tournament and beat Melanie Oudin and Edina Gallovits-Hall in the first two rounds, before losing to former world No. 15, Aravane Rezaï, in the quarterfinals.

Schoofs tried to qualify for the main draw of the French Open. However, she was beaten in three close sets by Akgul Amanmuradova from Uzbekistan, in the first round. Schoofs also tried to qualify for the main draw of the WTA tournament in Birmingham, played on grass. She was beaten in the first round by Melanie Oudin, 6–4, 7–6. This was her first match on grass in seven years. She again played qualifying at the Wimbledon Championships where she beat Dia Evtimova, 6–2, 6–2, and Zheng Saisai, 6–3, 6–3, to reach the final qualifying round of a Grand Slam tournament for the first time in her career. She held three setpoints in the first set against Mirjana Lučić before succumbing 5–7, 4–6.

Schoofs suffered a shock loss at the $25k tournament in Ystad where she was the top seed. The transition from grass to clay was too difficult to handle for her; she lost to Austrian Nicole Rottmann in three sets. Schoofs played a $50k clay-court tournament in Versmold, Germany the week after that. She beat French qualifier Anaïs Laurendon in the first round. She defeated Leticia Costas in the second round, and Kristina Mladenovic in the quarterfinals (all in straight sets), and faced former world No. 36, Anastasija Sevastova, in the semifinals.

2018: Maiden doubles title and top 100 debut
Schoofs won the doubles title of the Auckland Open together with her partner, five-time Grand Slam winner Sara Errani. With this victory, Schoofs entered the top 100 of the WTA rankings in women's doubles.

At the Australian Open qualifying, Schoofs defeated world No. 119, Naomi Broady, in the second round, but lost in the third and final round against Ivana Jorović, with a score of 3–6, 3–6.

2020–2023: Grand Slam debut in doubles, 2nd WTA doubles title
She made her major debut in doubles at the 2020 French Open, partnering compatriot Lesley Pattinama Kerkhove.

At the 2023 WTA Lyon Open, she won her second doubles title with Cristina Bucsa, three years after she reached the final at the same tournament with a different partner, Lesley Kerkhove. As a result, she reached a doubles ranking of No. 164, on 6 February 2023.

Grand Slam singles performance timeline

WTA career finals

Doubles: 4 (2 titles, 2 runner-ups)

WTA Challenger finals

Doubles: 2 (1 title, 1 runner-up)

ITF finals

Singles: 19 (8 titles, 11 runner–ups)

Doubles: 39 (21 titles, 18 runner–ups)

Notes

References

External links

 
 
 
 Own website 

1988 births
Living people
People from Rhenen
Dutch female tennis players
Sportspeople from Utrecht (province)
20th-century Dutch women
20th-century Dutch people
21st-century Dutch women